The Hanover Tache Junior Hockey League is a junior ice hockey league in Manitoba, Canada, sanctioned by Hockey Manitoba. It is the only Junior 'C' league in Manitoba, and as such, league champions are also named provincial Junior 'C' champions.

History 
The HTJHL operates exclusively in the southeastern part of the province. It was created in 1987 to complement the now-defunct senior level Hanover-Taché Hockey League, which has since been succeeded by the Carillon Senior Hockey League.

The number of teams has fluctuated throughout the years, with a high of ten teams competing in 2011-12.

Steinbach Huskies are the most successful club claiming the HTJHL championship eight times (1989, 1990, 2005, 2006, 2007, 2009, 2012, 2014).

Teams

* = team on hiatus

Former/Inactive teams 
Beausejour-Brokenhead Shock (2010–2013)
Grunthal Red Wings (1987–2017; 2018–)
Île-des-Chênes Elks (1987–2004)
La Broquerie Habs (1987–2005; 2006–09; 2011–14; 2020–)
Landmark Blues (1987–1995; 2020–)
Mitchell Mohawks (1988–2019) - on hiatus in 2019
Niverville Clippers - (2008-2015; 2020-)
Northeast Ice
Red River Rockets - became Red River Mudbugs
St. Adolphe Hawks (1999–2008; 2016–18; 2020–)
Ste. Anne Aces (1991–2007)
St. Pierre 59ers (2009–2014)

League champions

See also
Hanover-Taché Hockey League
Carillon Senior Hockey League

References

External links
HTJHL official website
@HTJHL on Twitter

Hockey Manitoba
Sport in Eastman Region, Manitoba
1987 establishments in Manitoba
Ice hockey leagues in Manitoba
C
Sports leagues established in 1987